Have You Seen Me Lately is the 15th studio album by American singer-songwriter Carly Simon, released by Arista Records, on September 25, 1990.

The album spent 32 weeks on the US Billboard 200, peaking at No. 60. The first single, "Better Not Tell Her", was very successful on the Billboard Adult Contemporary chart, charting for 21 weeks, peaking at No. 4, and becoming Simon's biggest hit of the 1990s. The second single, "Holding Me Tonight", was also successful on this chart, peaking at No. 36 and charting for five weeks. The track "Fisherman's Song" features backing vocals by Judy Collins and Simon's sister, Lucy Simon. Simon released a children's book based on the song the following year.

The album's title track was written for the Mike Nichols film Postcards from the Edge (1990), but the entire title sequence – including the song – was deleted by producers, although a great deal of Simon's underscore compositions and thematic interludes remain in the film, eventually earning her a BAFTA nomination for Best Film Score in 1991.

Reception and promotion

A critical and commercial success, Have You Seen Me Lately spent eight months on the Billboard 200, while Stephen Holden, writing in The New York Times, called the album "superb" and the title track "the album's most stunning moment". Greg Sandow, writing for Entertainment Weekly, graded the album B, and stated "'Life Is Eternal' breathes an air of genuine uplift" and "'Better Not Tell Her' and the title track sound firm, tender, and genuine, with pointed melodies and an airy outdoor aura". In a retrospective review from AllMusic, William Ruhlmann rated the album three stars out of five: "Simon has always written songs for her age group; here, it's the fortysomethings of the 1990s. At the end, "We Just Got Here" provides the summer's-end metaphor for middle age." Ruhlmann also singled out the tracks "Better Not Tell Her" and "Fisherman's Song".

Simon released music videos for the singles "Better Not Tell Her" and "Holding Me Tonight"; the former being shot on a beach on Martha's Vineyard in July 1990 - at the estate of Jackie Onassis. Simon also performed the latter on Late Night with David Letterman in 1990. Simon performed the tracks "Happy Birthday" and "Life Is Eternal" on a 1991 episode of The Phil Donahue Show.

Awards

Track listing
Credits adapted from the album's liner notes.

Personnel

Musicians

Production

Charts
Album – Billboard (United States)

Album – International

Singles – Billboard (United States)

References

External links
Carly Simon's Official Website

1990 albums
Arista Records albums
Carly Simon albums
Albums produced by Frank Filipetti
Albums produced by Paul Samwell-Smith
Albums recorded at MSR Studios